The 101st Rifle Division was a unit of the Soviet Red Army initially formed as a mountain rifle division on 28 August 1938 within the 2nd Separate Red Banner Army in Petropavlovsk-Kamchatsky city.

History
Initially the division included the 138th Rifle Regiment formed in 1938 from the 292nd Rifle Regiment of the Pacific Ocean Fleet, which had been created in 1937 from the 10th Separate Territorial Rifle Battalion of the 4th Bashkir Regiment. In 1940, the division was removed from the roll of first line formations. According to the Soviet General Staff order of battle study it was converted to a regular rifle division in December 1941 but the Personnel Department's list of commanders shows it as a rifle division from October 1940 to the end of the war. It remained on Sakhalin Island for the duration of the war, apart from the Soviet invasion of Manchuria.

In 1943 the HQ of the 101st division included: the 128th Mixed Aviation Division, Petropavlovsk Military Naval Base, border security detachment, the 428th howitzer artillery regiment, the 302nd Separate Rifle Regiment, three separate artillery divisions (battalions), the 5th Separate Rifle Battalion, and a number of storage facilities. From 15 January 1945 the division was included in the composition of the Northern Group of Forces of the Far Eastern Front and subordinated to the Kamchatka Defense Area of the Front. It was still in this formation as of 3 September.

For exemplary fulfillment of assignments and displaying combat mastery during the taking of the islands Shumshu and Paramushir in the course of the Kuril Landing operation, the Presidium of the Supreme Soviet of the USSR, declared by order of NKO No. 0164, the division was awarded the Order of Lenin on 14 September 1945.

The division became part of the 137th Rifle Corps postwar at Paramushir. In 1948 it was converted into the 6th Machine Gun Artillery Division. The division was disbanded in 1953, following the 1952 Severo-Kurilsk tsunami.

August 1945 Order of Battle
In August 1945 the composition of the 101st rifle division was:
Headquarters and Staff
 KAD (Commander of artillery division) command platoon
 SMERSH detachment
 Infantry training battalion
 169th Anti-Tank Battalion
 119th Sapper Battalion
 103rd Signals Battalion
 131st Medical Battalion
 38th Chemical Defence Company
 70th Field post office
 Divisional sewing repair shop
 Anti-aircraft machine gun company
 13th Mobile field hospital
 178th Divisional veterinary infirmary
 9th Field Bakery
 Armored train, 19th cavalry squadron
 138th Rifle Regiment
 302nd Rifle Regiment
 373rd Rifle Regiment
 279th Artillery Regiment(Light)

Commanders
The following officers commanded the division.
 Major (from 21 September 1940 brigade commander) Aksenty Gorodnyansky (August 1938 – 25 October 1940)
 Colonel (from 2 January 1942 Major General) Ivan Pichugin (25 October 1940 – 27 June 1942)
 Major General Semyon Mozhaev (27 June 1942 – 22 September 1943)
 Major General Porfiry Dyakov (22 September 1943 – 4 November 1945).

Awards 
Order of Lenin – Awarded on 14 September 1945.

References

Citations

Bibliography

External links 
Division history (Russian)
Avksentii Mikhailovich Gorodnianskii
Ivan Pavlovich Pichugin
Semyon Fyodorovich Mozhaev
Porfirii Ivanovich Dyakov

Infantry divisions of the Soviet Union in World War II
Military units and formations established in 1938
Military units and formations disestablished in 1948